Last call is an announcement made in a bar before serving drinks is stopped.

Last Call may also refer to:

Film and television
 Last Call (1958 film), an Australian television play
 Last Call (1991 film), a thriller film
 Last Call (1999 film), a Chilean-American thriller featuring Peter Coyote and Elizabeth Berkley
 Last Call (2002 film), a film about F. Scott Fitzgerald
 Last Call, a 2004 film featuring Lynn Cohen
 Last Call, a 2005 short film written by Laura Censabella
 Last Call, a 2006 film featuring Natalie Denise Sperl
 Last Call, a 2008 film starring Lori Petty
 Last Call (2012 film), a film starring Diora Baird
 Last Call (2020 film), a Bulgarian film starring Maria Bakalova
 Last Call (2021 film), a film starring Jeremy Piven
 Last Call (TV series), an American sitcom that aired on Bounce TV
 Last Call with Carson Daly, an American late-night television talk show
 Last Call (talk show), a 1994 American late-night television show hosted by Tad Low
 Last Call, a Canadian late-night television show that aired on Toronto One
 "The Last Call" (The Good Wife), a television episode

Literature
 Last Call (novel), a 1992 novel by Tim Powers
 Last Call (Grippando novel), a 2008 novel by James Grippando
 Last Call, a 2004 short-story collection by K. L. Cook
 Last Call: Memoirs of an NFL Referee, a 1999 book by Jerry Markbreit
 Last Call: The Rise and Fall of Prohibition, a 2010 book by Daniel Okrent
 "Last Call", a 2009 short-story set in the Dresden Files book series by Jim Butcher

Music

Albums
 Last Call (Rittz album), 2017
 Last Call, by Betty Blowtorch, 2003
 Last Call, by Cayouche, 2003
 Last Call, by Jeff Healey, 2010

Songs
 "Last Call" (Dave Van Ronk song)
 "Last Call" (Lee Ann Womack song)
 "Last Call", by the Alkaholiks from 21 & Over
 "Last Call", by Elliott Smith from Roman Candle
 "Last Call", by Junior Walker & The All-Stars from Road Runner
 "Last Call", by Kanye West from The College Dropout
"Last Call", by Katy Hudson (later known as Katy Perry) from Katy Hudson
 "Last Call", by Logic from YSIV
 "Last Call", by OutKast from Speakerboxxx/The Love Below
 "Last Call", by Patti Smith from Peace and Noise
 "Last Call", by the Plain White T's from All That We Needed
 "Last Call", by The Saturdays from On Your Radar

Other uses
 Last Call (store), a chain of clearance centers operated by Neiman Marcus
 Last Call (video game), a 2000 computer game
 Operation Last Call, a law enforcement initiative in Texas, US
 Last Call, a program on Hardcore Sports Radio

See also